Panshet Dam, also called Tanajisagar Dam, is a dam on the Ambi river, a tributary of the Mutha River, about  southwest of the city of Pune in western India.The dam was constructed in late 1950s for irrigation and, along with three other dams nearby, Varasgaon, Temghar and Khadakwasla, it supplies drinking water to Pune.

History 
Panshet Dam burst in its first year of storing water on 12 July 1961, when the dam wall burst, because of the total absence of reinforced cement concrete (RCC) strengthening in the conduit through the earthen dam. Plain unreinforced concrete blocks were used instead due to a shortage of steel. causing massive flooding in Pune. An estimated 1,000 people died from the resulting flood.

Location

Specifications

Purpose
 Irrigation
 Water supply

See also
List of dams and reservoirs in Maharashtra
List of dams and reservoirs in India

References

Dams in Pune district
1972 establishments in Maharashtra
Dams completed in 1972
20th-century architecture in India

de:Panshet und Khadakwasla